The 4th California Infantry was a volunteer infantry regiment recruited from northern California during the American Civil War. It was organized at Sacramento, Placerville, and Auburn in September and October 1861.

4th California Regiment of Infantry Commanders
 Colonel Henry M. Judah, September 1861 - November, 1861.
 Colonel Ferris Forman, November, 1861 - August 20, 1863.
 Colonel James F. Curtis, August 20, 1863 - until it was disbanded by consolidation, November 30, 1865

Most of the recruits, caught up in war fever, expected to be sent to the eastern battlefields. They were disappointed to be instead ordered to garrison duty and related tasks on the West Coast, where they spent the remainder of their enlistments.  The regiment served principally in the District of Oregon, (Oregon and Washington Territory), and in the District of Southern California. None of these duties required regimental strength, so the companies of the regiment were detached and scattered.  The regiment was mustered out on April 18, 1866.

Company assignments
 Regimental headquarters - First located at Auburn, Placer County.  While stationed there five companies were sent to the District of Oregon to relieve the regulars stationed there. From February to May, 1862, headquarters and five companies were at Camp Union, near Sacramento.  During the month of May headquarters was moved to Camp Latham, near Los Angeles, where it remained until September, 1862, when it was transferred to Drum Barracks, where it remained during the rest of the time the regiment was in the service.
Company "A" - This company was organized at Placerville, September 21, 1861.  Moved from San Francisco to Fort Vancouver, Washington Territory, October 29-November 4, 1861.  At Fort Walla Walla, Washington Territory, until August, 1862. Ordered to San Francisco August 15 and duty at Benicia Barracks until March, 1863. Ordered to Camp Drum March 1, and duty there until January, 1864.  At Santa Barbara until the terms of service of most of the members expired, and they were discharged at Drum Barracks, October 13, 1864.
New Company "A" - The few whose terms had not expired, with recruits were organized into a new company. At Santa Barbara until November, 1864. At Cahuenga Pass, November 30, 1864; at Drum Barracks, December, 1864, and January, 1865. Sent during the month of April 1865 to Fort Humboldt.  At Camp Iaqua May 1, 1865, until it was ordered to the Presidio of San Francisco, for final muster out on November 30, 1865.
Company "B" - Captain Fitch and Lieutenant Copely of the Mountain Volunteers joined this company, which was organized at Placerville, September 25, 1861.  Moved from San Francisco to Fort Vancouver, Washington Territory, October 29-November 4, 1861.  At Fort Vancouver until March, 1862. At Fort Dalles to October, 1862. Ordered to San Francisco October 3, and duty at Benicia Barracks until March, 1863. Ordered to Camp Drum March 1, 1863, thence to Fort Mojave April 29, and duty there until June, 1864. Ordered to Drum Barracks, and duty there until mustered out. 
New Company "B" - Ordered to Fort Humboldt April 5, 1865, thence to Fort Gaston, and duty there until muster out. 
Company "C" - This company was recruited in Shasta County during the month of September, 1861. It was marched to Auburn, Placer County, where it was mustered into the United States service October 5, 1861.  Moved from San Francisco to Fort Vancouver, Washington Territory, October 29-November 4, 1861.  At Fort Walla Walla, Washington Territory, until August, 1862. Ordered to San Francisco August 14, and duty at Benicia Barracks until March, 1863. At San Francisco until May. Ordered to Camp Drum May 28, 1863, and duty there until January, 1864. Occupation of Santa Catalina Island January 2, and duty at Camp Santa Catalina Island until December, 1864. At Drum Barracks until March, 1865, and at Fort Mojave until muster out. 
Company "D" - This company was organized at Auburn, Placer County, and mustered into the United States service October 15, 1861. Moved from San Francisco to Fort Vancouver, Washington Territory, October 29-November 4, 1861.  At Fort Yamhill, Oregon, until March, 1863. Ordered to Fort Hoskins March 25, and duty there until December, 1864. Expedition from Siletz Block House to Coos Bay April 21-May 12, 1864.  At Fort Yamhill until muster out.
New Company D -  The original company D was mustered out at Fort Vancouver, October 15, 1864.  It was immediately reorganized by re-enlistments and recruiting, and was stationed at Fort Yamhill during nearly all the balance of its term of service. It was finally mustered out at the Presidio, S. F., December 19, 1865.
Company "E" - This company was organized at Auburn, Placer County, and mustered into the United States service October 10, 1861.  Moved from San Francisco to Fort Vancouver, Washington Territory, October 29-November 4, 1861.  At Fort Steilacoom until October 3, 1862. Ordered to San Francisco, and duty at Benicia Barracks until May, 1863. Ordered to Drum Barracks May 28, and duty there until January, 1864. At Fort Yuma until June, 1865. At Drum Barracks until muster out. 
Company "F" - This company was raised in Coloma, El Dorado County, in September, and was mustered into the United States service at Auburn, Placer County, October 16, 1861.  At Camp Sigel, near Auburn, until January, 1862. Moved to Camp Union, Sacramento, thence to San Francisco April 28, and to Camp Latham, Southern California. At Camp Drum until March, 1863. Moved to Fort Yuma March 1, 1863; to La Paz, Arizona, April 28, 1863; to Fort Yuma August 15, and to Drum Barracks November 7, 1864. 
New Company "F" - To Fort Humboldt May 1, 1865. Duty in Humboldt Military District until muster out. 
Company "G" - This company was organized at Camp Sigel, near Auburn, October 26, 1861. At Camp Sigel, until January, 1862. Moved to Camp Union, Sacramento, thence to San Francisco April 28, 1862, and to Camp Latham, District of Southern California. Ordered to San Diego, California, and duty there until muster out. 
Company "H" - This company was mustered into service, February 6, 1862, at Camp Union. Moved to San Francisco April 28, and to Camp Latham, Southern California. Duty at Camp Latham and Camp Drum until March, 1863. Ordered to Fort Yuma March 1, and duty there until January, 1864. Moved to Drum Barracks January, 1864, thence to San Luis Obispo July 27, 1864. Return to Drum Barracks and duty there until muster out. 
Company "I" - This company was raised in Nevada City, and was mustered into service at Camp Sigel, on the seventh day of October, 1861.  At Camp Sigel, until January, 1862. Moved to Camp Union, Sacramento, thence to San Francisco April 28, and duty at Benicia Barracks until November, 1862. To Fort Umpqua November 12. Duty there and at Benicia Barracks until March, 1863. Moved to Camp Drum under Captain Charles Atchisson March 6 and to Fort Mojave April 29, and duty there until muster out. 
Company "K" - This company was organized at Camp Union, February 1, 1862.  Moved to San Francisco April 28, 1862, and duty at Benicia Barracks until March, 1863.  Moved to Camp Drum March 6, thence to Fort Yuma, and duty until April, 1864; at Drum Barracks until April, 1865; at Camp Lincoln until July, 1865; at San Bernardino until August, 1865; and at Drum Barracks until it was ordered to the Presidio of San Francisco, for final muster out on November 30, 1865.

Reenactors
A group located in western and central Oregon and northern California reenacts Company D.
Companies A, B, C, D and E were sent to the Washington Territory in late 1862 and were recalled at varying times throughout 1862. One of the best documented of these detachments is that of Company D, which was sent to Fort Hoskins and Fort Yamhill in Oregon.  It participated in the Expedition from Siletz Block House to Coos Bay April 21-May 12, 1864.  A number of Company D's soldiers did not return to California, choosing to settle in Oregon and start new lives there.

See also
List of California Civil War Union units

References

  The War of the Rebellion: Volume 35, Part 1 CORRESPONDENCE, ORDERS, AND RETURNS RELATING TO OPERATIONS ON THE PACIFIC COAST FROM JULY 1, 1862, TO JUNE 30, 1865. By United States. War Dept, Robert Nicholson Scott, Henry Martyn WASHINGTON: GOVERNMENT PRINTING OFFICE. 1897
  Records of California men in the war of the rebellion 1861 to 1867, By California. Adjutant General's Office, SACRAMENTO: State Office, J. D. Young, Supt. State Printing. 1890.

Further reading 
 Bensell, Royal A.; Barth, Gunther (ed.) (1959) All Quiet on the Yamhill: The Civil War in Oregon: The Journal of Corporal Royal A. Bensell, Company D, Fourth California Infantry.
 Masich, Andrew E.; The Civil War in Arizona; The Story of the California Volunteers, 1861-65  (University of Oklahoma Press, Norman, 2006)

External links
The Civil War Archive, Union Regimental Index, California
  The California State Military Museum; 4th Regiment of Infantry  
 Company D reenactors 

Units and formations of the Union Army from California
Oregon in the American Civil War
Military units and formations established in 1861
1861 establishments in California
Military units and formations disestablished in 1866